Qarah Zamin (also Romanized as Qarah Zamīn) is a village in Qarah Quyun-e Shomali Rural District, in the Central District of Showt County, West Azerbaijan Province, Iran. At the 2006 census, its population was 602, in 130 families.

References 

Populated places in Showt County